Sergei Bogdanovich Semak (born 27 February 1976) is a Russian football manager and a former international midfielder who currently manages Russian Premier League side FC Zenit.

Early life
Semak was born in the selo Sychanskoye in the Voroshilovgradskaya Oblast into a peasant family of modest economical background. He was an excellent student and had an ideal behavior. When he was a child his teachers would argue as to whether he would become a mathematician or a football player.

He left Ukraine shortly before the USSR fall, but his parents stayed there. He would become a Russian naturalized citizen, but until today he uses to visit his bornland; he had declared that he misses Ukraine.

His older brother Andrei Semak and younger brother Nikolai Semak were also professional footballers.

Club career
Semak started training football at the Luhansk football school. In 1992, he signed in Presnya Moscow who played in the Russian Top Division. After 19 matches scoring 4 goals he was sold to Karelia Petrozavodsk, but in 1993 returned to Presnya Moscow, which had changed its name to Asmaral Moscow.

In 1994, he was noted and signed by CSKA Moscow. He became the club's captain and leader. With the club he won the Russian Premier League in 2003, the Russian Cup in 2002 and 2005. He left the club after it finished third in the group stage of the UEFA Champions League 2004–05 and did not move on to the knockout stage. This was despite his hat-trick against Paris Saint-Germain in the final group game.

In 2005, he then moved to the team he scored the hat-trick against, Paris Saint-Germain, but failed to settle, scoring just one goal. After just one season he returned to Russia.

In 2006, he signed for FC Moscow, where he stayed until 2008 when he moved to Rubin Kazan. In Rubin Semak was moved from the positions of striker and attacking midfielder to the position of a defensive midfielder. At Rubin Kazan he became the captain and leader of the team, and led it to its first two championship titles in 2008 and 2009.

In August 2010, he transferred to Zenit Saint Petersburg.

International career
Semak made his international debut for the Russia national team in 1997 and took part in the 2002 FIFA World Cup in South Korea and Japan.

Having lost his place in the national team with the arrival of Guus Hiddink in 2006, Semak missed out on Russia's Euro 2008 qualifying campaign, but was recalled to the national team, just prior to the Euro 2008 finals. Semak captained the Russia national team in their first Euro 2008 warm-up friendly against Kazakhstan, and during the rest of the campaign. Semak had a good performance in the crucial match against Greece and provided an assist for the only goal Russia scored with a skilled bicycle kick pass from a wide angle. Another notable performance in Euro 2008 came in the quarter-finals during which he was playing his 50th game for his country, when his precise left-wing cross was volleyed in by Roman Pavlyuchenko against the Netherlands.

Managerial career
After his retirement, Semak was named as assistant coach of Zenit Saint Petersburg. He was appointed interim coach of the club after the sacking of Luciano Spalletti on 10 March 2014. He held the position until 18 March when André Villas-Boas was appointed as the team manager.

On 30 December 2016, he was appointed a manager of the Russian Premier League club FC Ufa.

On 29 May 2018, he returned to Zenit St. Petersburg, signing a two-year contract with one-year extension option. In his first year, he won the 2018–19 Russian Premier League. He led Zenit to the title again in the 2019–20 Russian Premier League. On 25 July 2020, he sealed the double for the club by winning the 2019–20 Russian Cup. On 2 May 2021, Zenit secured their third title in a row in a 6-1 victory over second-place FC Lokomotiv Moscow. On 30 April 2022, Zenit secured their fourth title in a row.

Career statistics

Scores and results list Russia's goal tally first, score column indicates score after each Semak goal.

Managerial statistics

Honours

Player
CSKA Moscow 
Russian Premier League: 2003
Russian Cup: 2001–02
Russian Super Cup: 2004

Paris Saint-Germain 
Coupe de France: 2005–06

Rubin Kazan 
Russian Premier League: 2008, 2009
Russian Super Cup: 2010

Zenit 
Russian Premier League: 2010, 2011–12
Russian Super Cup: 2011

Russia 
UEFA European Championship: 2008 bronze medalist

Individual
In the list of 33 best football players of the championship of Russia (8): 1997, 1998, 1999, 2000, 2001, 2002, 2008, 2009
Member of Grigory Fedotov club

Manager
Zenit
Russian Premier League: 2018–19, 2019–20, 2020–21, 2021–22
Russian Cup: 2019–20
Russian Super Cup: 2020, 2021, 2022

Individual
Russian Premier League Coach of the Season: 2020–21, 2021–22
Russian Premier League Coach of the Month: August 2022.

References

External links

 
 
 Profile at RussiaTeam 
 

1976 births
Living people
People from Luhansk Oblast
Association football midfielders
Russian footballers
Russian expatriate footballers
Expatriate footballers in France
FC Asmaral Moscow players
PFC CSKA Moscow players
Paris Saint-Germain F.C. players
FC Moscow players
FC Rubin Kazan players
FC Zenit Saint Petersburg players
2002 FIFA World Cup players
Russia youth international footballers
Russia under-21 international footballers
Russia international footballers
Russian Premier League players
Ligue 1 players
UEFA Euro 2008 players
Russians in Ukraine
Russian people of Ukrainian descent
Russian football managers
FC Zenit Saint Petersburg managers
FC Zenit Saint Petersburg non-playing staff
Russian Premier League managers
FC Ufa managers